Essen-Kray Süd station is one of two railway stations in the German city of Essen, North Rhine-Westphalia, located in the district of Essen-Kray. The other one is Essen-Kray Nord station on the Essen–Gelsenkirchen railway line.

History
The station was opened in 1896 with the name Kray Süd as the second Kray station after the aforementioned Essen-Kray Nord from 1873. It contributed to the development of Kray and the neighbouring Leithe during the period of industrialisation in the Ruhrgebiet. In 1929 Kray was incorporated into the city of Essen. In 1950 the station received its present name Essen-Kray Süd. In 1974 the station was classified as a Haltepunkt.

References

Railway stations in Essen
Buildings and structures in Essen
Railway stations in Germany opened in 1896
1896 establishments in Prussia